Hasan Kaya (born 10 November 1995) is a Turkish footballer who plays as a forward for Turkish club Ankara Demirspor.

Career
Kaya made his professional debut Ankaragücü with in a 1–1 Süper Lig tie with Kayserispor on 24 August 2019.

References

External links
 
 

1995 births
Footballers from Hamburg
German people of Turkish descent
Living people
German footballers
Association football forwards
MKE Ankaragücü footballers
Ankara Demirspor footballers
24 Erzincanspor footballers
Süper Lig players
TFF Second League players
TFF Third League players
German expatriate footballers
Expatriate footballers in Turkey
German expatriate sportspeople in Turkey